Callan Castle at 145 (old numbering system: 61) Elizabeth Street NE (corner of Euclid St.) in the Inman Park neighborhood of Atlanta, was originally the mansion of Asa Griggs Candler, the business tycoon who made his fortune selling Coca-Cola. It was built in 1902-1903 by George Murphy in Beaux-Arts style; the land and building cost almost $13,000. The name alludes to the family's ancestral home in Ireland (as does Callanwolde, the mansion of Candler's eldest son)

In 1916 Candler moved to his new mansion at 1500 Ponce de Leon Avenue in the Druid Hills neighborhood of Atlanta, which is currently a Melkite Catholic church.

Callan Castle was restored in 2011. The home has a 2012 estimated market value of $1.2 million.

Architecture
The home is about  large, one of the largest homes in Inman Park. It has a two-story pedimented portico, alluding to Greek Revival mansions, but according to the AIA Guide to the Architecture of Atlanta, "the rambling mass of the building, the asymmetrical position the entrance doorway, and the mixture of materials are definitely Victorian in character. The delicate decor of garlands on the entablature and the Palladian motif above it are characteristic of the Colonial Revival style."

External links
March 2012 article in Atlanta Homes about the restoration of Callan Castle

References

Residential buildings in Atlanta
Buildings and structures completed in 1903
Coca-Cola buildings and structures
Beaux-Arts architecture in Georgia (U.S. state)